Eloy Cantú Segovia (born 24 September 1952) is a Mexican politician affiliated with the PRI. He currently serves as Deputy of the LXII Legislature of the Mexican Congress representing Nuevo León. He also served as Deputy during two Legislatures (1991–94 and 2000–03) and as Senator (LVI, LVII, LX and LXI Legislatures)

References

1952 births
Living people
Politicians from Monterrey
Members of the Senate of the Republic (Mexico)
Members of the Chamber of Deputies (Mexico)
Institutional Revolutionary Party politicians
21st-century Mexican politicians